Bernat Klein CBE (6 November 1922 – 17 April 2014) was a Serbian textile designer and painter. Based in Scotland, Klein supplied textiles to haute couture designers in the 1960s and 1970s, and later sold his own clothing collections.

Biography
Klein was born in 1922 in Senta, Kingdom of Serbs, Croats and Slovenes. In 1940 he attended the Bezalel Academy of Arts and Design, Jerusalem, and then moved on to the University of Leeds, England, where he studied textile technology from 1945. He was employed by various textile companies in England and Scotland, until 1952 when he established Colourcraft (Gala) Ltd. This comprised a weaving centre in Galashiels in the Scottish Borders, producing rugs and other items which were sold at the company's own shop in Edinburgh. He created innovative textiles, building up trade with producers such as Marks and Spencer.

In 1962, Coco Chanel chose Klein's fabrics for her spring collection, which led to greater exposure and further sales to couture houses in the US and Europe including Dior, Balenciaga, Pierre Cardin and Saint Laurent. The company was renamed Bernat Klein Limited, and a major stake in the business was acquired by a subsidiary of Imperial Tobacco.

Klein resigned from this company in 1966, setting up on his own again. He based himself at his home near Selkirk, where he commissioned a studio building from the architect Peter Womersley, who had designed Klein's house, High Sunderland, in the 1950s. He established a cottage industry of hand-knitters, employing up to 250 people. During the 1970s he began producing his own clothing collections, and later established himself as a design and colour consultant. The Department of the Environment commissioned him in the latter capacity to develop standard ranges of carpets and upholstery fabrics.

Klein drew inspiration from nature for his textiles and paintings. His signature fabrics include colourful exotic tweeds, incorporating mohair and ribbons, as well as velvet and jersey fabrics. He won the Design Council Award in 1968, and was awarded an honorary degree from Heriot-Watt University in 2003.

References

External links
Bernat Klein's paintings, artnet
Photo of Bernat Klein with two of his paintings in 1965, Getty Images
"A Visionary Textile Designer with an Eye for Colour", Bernat Klein retrospective, Craft Scotland
Bernat Klein's fabrics, National Museums Scotland

1922 births
2014 deaths
People from Senta
Serbian Jews
Serbian painters
Serbian fashion designers
Textile designers
Jewish painters
Commanders of the Order of the British Empire
People associated with the Scottish Borders
Bezalel Academy of Arts and Design alumni
Yugoslav expatriates in Scotland
Expatriates in Mandatory Palestine
Yugoslav emigrants to the United Kingdom